Jalan Penyabong or Jalan Haji Ariffin (Johor state route J182) is a major road in Johor, Malaysia

List of junctions

Roads in Johor